Statistics of the Primera División de México for the 1954–55 season.

Overview 
Irapuato was promoted to Primera División.

The season was contested by 12 teams, and Zacatepec won the championship.

Marte was relegated to Segunda División.

Teams

League standings

Results

Promotion Playoff
With the intention of increasing the number of teams in the First Division to 14 clubs, the Mexican Football Federation organized a promotional tournament between the two worst teams of the first level and the second, third and fourth teams of the Second Division. The playoff had five teams: Atlante, Marte, Cuautla, Querétaro and Zamora.

Standings

Results

References
Mexico - List of final tables (RSSSF)

1954-55
Mex
1954–55 in Mexican football